The shehnai is a musical instrument, originating from the Indian subcontinent. It is made of wood, with a double reed at one end and a metal or wooden flared bell at the other end. Its sound is thought to create and maintain a sense of auspiciousness and sanctity and as a result, is of nine instruments found in the royal court. The shehnai is similar to South India's nadaswaram.

Characteristics 
This tubular instrument gradually broadens towards the lower end. It usually has between six and nine holes. It employs one set of quadruple reeds, making it a quadruple reed woodwind. To master the instrument, the musician must employ various and intricate embouchure and fingering techniques.

The shehnai has a range of two octaves, from the A below middle C to the A one line above the treble clef (A3 to A5 in scientific pitch notation).

A shehnai is often but not always made with a body of wood or bamboo and a flared metal end.

Origin of the shehnai 
The shehnai is thought to have been developed by improving upon the pungi (a woodwind folk instrument used primarily for snake charming).

Another theory of the origin of the shehnai is that the name is a modification of the word "shah-nai". The word "nai" is used in many Indian languages to mean barber. The word "shah" refers to a Royal. Since it was first played in the Shah's chambers and was played by a nai (barber), the instrument was named "shehnai". The sound of the shehnai began to be considered auspicious. And for this reason it is still played in temples and is an indispensable component of any Indian wedding. In the past, the Shehnai was part of the naubat or traditional ensemble of nine instruments found at royal courts. Till recently it was used only in temples and weddings. The credit for bringing this instrument onto the classical stage goes to Ustad Bismillah Khan.

The counterparts to the shehnai played in Western India and Coastal Karnataka are indigenous to the territory. Shehnai players were/are an integral part of Goan/Konkani region and the temples along the western coast and the players are called Vajantri and were allotted lands for services rendered to the temples.

Gallery

Notable Indian shehnai players 
Anant Lal
Bismillah Khan
S. Ballesh
Ali Ahmed Hussain Khan
Raghunath Prasanna

See also 
Mizmar, a shawm similar to the shehnai
Nadaswaram, a similar South Indian instrument
Reed instrument, a type of woodwind instrument
Shawm, a type of reed instrument

Notes

References 
 
 

Single oboes with conical bore
Hindustani musical instruments
Quadruple-reed instruments
Nepalese musical instruments